Apenanti (Greek: Απέναντι; English: Opposite) is the 12th album by Greek singer Natasa Theodoridou. It was released on 12 March 2012 by Sony Music Greece and received platinum certification in Greece, selling 12,000 units. The album was written entirely by Giorgos Theofanous with lyrics by Thanos Papanikolaou. Singles from the album included "Apenanti", "Gia Kanena" and "Tha 'Rtho Na Se Do".

Track listing

Credits 
Credits adapted from liner notes.

Personnel 
Dimitris Antoniou: electric guitar (tracks: 1, 2)
Akis Diximos: backing vocals (tracks: 3, 7, 8) || second vocal (tracks: 2, 6, 9, 10)
Katerina Kiriakou: backing vocals (tracks: 3, 7, 8)
Spiros Kontakis: electric guitar (tracks: 5, 6)
Menios Pasialis: drums (tracks: 1, 2, 3, 4, 5, 6, 8, 9, 10)
Christos Pertsinidis: acoustic guitar (tracks: 1, 2)
Dimos Polimeris: accordion (tracks: 3, 8)
Nikos Sakellarakis: trumpet (tracks: 10)
Panagiotis Stergiou: baglama (tracks: 4, 8, 9) || bouzouki (tracks: 1, 2, 3, 4, 6, 8, 9) || cura (tracks: 4, 6, 8)
Leonidas Tzitzos: orchestration, programming
Giorgos Tzivelekis: bass (tracks: 1, 2, 3, 4, 5, 6, 8, 9, 10)
Fivos Zacharopoulos: guitar (tracks: 3, 4, 8, 9, 10)

Production 
Vasilis Bouloubasis: hair styling
Mirto Gkonou: art direction
Antonis Glikos: artwork
Thodoris Ikonomou (Sofita studio): mix engineer, sound engineer
Giannis Ioannidis (D.P.H.): mastering
Lefteris Neromiliotis (Sofita studio): mix engineer, sound engineer
Roula Revi: photographer
Giorgos Segradakis: styling
Petros Siakavellas (D.P.H.): editing
Roula Stamatopoulou: make up
Giorgos Theofanous: executive producer

References

2012 albums
Greek-language albums
Natasa Theodoridou albums
Sony Music Greece albums